Astley may refer to:

People
Astley (name)

Places in England
Astley, Greater Manchester, a village
Astley, Warwickshire, a village and parish
Astley, Worcestershire, a village and parish
Astley, Shropshire, a village and parish
Astley Village, in Lancashire
Astley's, London, Astley's Equestrian Amphitheatre
Astley Castle, North Warwickshire

See also
Astle (disambiguation)